Jackson Eskay is an American soccer player.

Career

Youth and amateur 
Eskay began playing organized travel soccer in 2002 when he joined local club, FC Frederick. He was part of their development teams through 2013. Eskay played high school soccer from 2009 through 2012 at Urbana High School, where he was a four-year starter. Eskay finished his high school career ranked second in assists and fourth in points (two points for goals and one point for assists combined). While at Urbana, Eskay helped lead the Hawks to Maryland 4A State Finals in 2010 and 2011. While in high school, Eskay was named to the Maryland ODP team and was named to the Maryland First-Team All-State selection in 2011 and 2012.

Upon graduating Urbana, Eskay signed a National Letter of Intent to play college soccer for the William & Mary Tribe men's soccer program. During the 2012 NCAA Division I men's soccer season, Eskay made 18 appearances and earned 12 starts, scoring twice his freshman year. Eskay earned CAA Rookie of the Week honors. Eskay had a breakout season his sophomore year, starting and playing in 19 matches, where he led the team with 8 goals, had 5 assists, for 21 points. Notable games he earned points included two matches against the then-No. 1 teams in the nation, Creighton and North Carolina. Eskay finished the season earning Third-Team All-CAA honors. Due to injury in the spring season, Eskay had a rather quiet junior season, playing 18 matches with 12 starts, and only scoring one goal. His senior year, he returned to form earning a spot on the VaSID First-Team, and earning all-CAA Second Team honors. He led the Tribe in points (20) and goals (8) during the 2015 NCAA Division I men's soccer season.′

Professional 

On March 24, 2016, Eskay signed his first professional contract with the Richmond Kickers of the second-division United Soccer League. Eskay made his professional debut on May 18, 2016 in a U.S. Open Cup fixture against Aromas Café FC. Eskay started the match and played for 68 minutes. The following Saturday, Eskay made his USL debut playing for the final minute of a 0–0 draw against Louisville City FC, coming on for Miguel Aguilar.

Statistics 

As of May 25, 2016

References 

1994 births
American soccer players
Soccer players from Maryland
Richmond Kickers players
USL Championship players
William & Mary Tribe men's soccer players
Living people
Association football midfielders
University of Pennsylvania Law School alumni